The men's 10000 metres at the 2015 Southeast Asian Games' was held in National Stadium, Singapore. The track and field events took place on June 10.

Schedule
All times are (UTC+08:00)

Records

Results 
Legend
SB — Seasonal Best
PB — Personal Best
DNS — Did Not Start

References

Athletics at the 2015 Southeast Asian Games